Castillo de Olite was a cargo steamship that was launched in 1920 in the Netherlands as Zaandijk. She passed through a series of Dutch and Soviet owners, and at different times was renamed Zwartewater, Postyshev and Akademik Pavlov. In 1938 the Spanish Nationalist Navy captured her and renamed her Castillo de Olite. In the last days of the Spanish Civil War she was sunk with great loss of life while serving as a troop ship.

Building
De Rotterdamsche Droogdok Maatschappij NV built the ship in Rotterdam, launching her on 20 November 1920 and completing her in 19 February 1921. She had a single screw, driven by a three-cylinder triple-expansion steam engine that was rated at 342 NHP.

Career
Zaandijks first owner was NV Solleveld, Van der Meer & TH van Hattum's Stoomvaart Maatschappij, who registered her in Rotterdam. Her code letters were QCVR. She traded to Java and Sumatra.

In 1930 NV Stoomvaart Maatschappij "Nederlandsche Lloyd" acquired Zaandijk and renamed her Zwartewater. She remained registered in Rotterdam, but her code letters were changed to QTDL.

In 1935 the USSR bought her, renamed her Postishev after the Ukrainian Communist Pavel Postyshev, and registered her in Odesa. In 1938 she was renamed Akedemik Pavlov.

On 31 May 1938 the Nationalist auxiliary cruiser Vicente Puchol captured Akademik Pavlov in the Strait of Gibraltar, when the latter was carrying a cargo of coal. She was incorporated in the Nationalist Spanish Navy as the Castillo de Olite, and armed with a 120 mm Vickers gun and a 57 mm Nordenfeldt gun.

Sinking

In the last days of the Spanish Civil War, Cartagena was one of the last Republican strongholds, and harboured most of the remaining Republican Navy. When the anti-communist Cartagena Uprising broke out, the Nationalists sent reinforcementsto try to capture Cartagena and the Republican fleet.

With less than 48 hours preparation, the Nationalists sent from Castellón and Málaga a convoy of 16 ships, carrying more than 20,000 troops. The convoy comprised the s Júpiter, Marte  and Vulcano, the auxiliary cruisers Lázaro, Jaime I, Domine and J.J. Sister and the transports Castillo de Olite, San Sebastián, Castillo Peñafiel, Gibraltar, Monforte, Mombeltrán, Huertas, Montealegre and Simancas.

The Republican fleet had left Cartagena for Oran, in Algeria, but the Republican Brigade 206 had retaken the port and its coastal defense batteries, thus preventing the Nationalist landing. The Nationalist ships retreated, except for Castillo de Olite, which had not received the order to withdraw, because her radio was out of order. While approaching the docks, one 152mm shell from a coastal battery hit her. She sank shortly afterwards, broken in two.

Of the 2,112 men aboard, 1,476 were killed, 342 were wounded and 294 were captured, after being rescued by local fishermen and the lighthouse keeper, Santiago Saavedra, and his wife, Carmen Hevia. This is the one of the greatest loss of life from the sinking of a single ship in Spanish maritime history.

Notes

References

1920 ships
Captured ships
Cargo ships of the Netherlands
Maritime incidents in 1939
Mediterranean naval operations of the Spanish Civil War
Merchant ships of the Soviet Union
Ships built in Rotterdam
Ships sunk by coastal artillery
Shipwrecks of the Spanish Civil War
Soviet Union–Spain relations
Steamships of the Netherlands
Steamships of Spain
Steamships of the Soviet Union
Troop ships